Brenda Rena Combs is ambassador of inspiration & achievement at the Grand Canyon University in Phoenix, Arizona. She was previously an elementary educator at the Starshine Academy, Phoenix. Combs went from homeless to becoming a respected teacher. Her autobiography In My Shoes will be available in late 2008.

Recognition 
She has been named one of the best teachers of the year for the 2005–2006 school year.
She was also listed on the National Deans List in 2004, 2005, and 2006.

Some of her accomplishments are:
 Letter of recognition from First Lady Laura Bush in May 2007
 Distinguished Teacher Award from Grand Canyon University 2007
 Who's Who Among America's Teachers
 Spirit of Education Award - University of Phoenix
 Member of Cambridge Who's Who 
 Phoenix Mercury WNBA 2008 Inspiring Woman of the Year Award

References

External links 
 National Alliance to End Homelessness
 Former addict lifts herself up, becomes a teacher

Year of birth missing (living people)
Living people
People from Phoenix, Arizona
Place of birth missing (living people)